Daniel Maurice Wheeldon (born 14 March 1989) is an English cricketer. Wheeldon is a right-handed batsman who bowls right-arm fast-medium. He was born in Nottingham, Nottinghamshire and was educated at Wilsthorpe Business and Enterprise College.

He was a member of Derbyshire Academy and played for the Yorkshire Second XI in 2010,
Wheeldon joined the Unicorns in 2011 to play in the Clydesdale Bank 40. He made his List A debut for the team against Gloucestershire. He has played 6 further List A matches for the team in 2011, the last of which came against Lancashire. He made his first-class debut for Derbyshire against Northamptonshire on 22 July 2018 in the 2018 County Championship.

References

External links

1989 births
Living people
Cricketers from Nottingham
English cricketers
Unicorns cricketers
Derbyshire cricketers